The Karate Kid is a 1984 film.

Karate Kid may also refer to:

The Karate Kid franchise
The Karate Kid Part II, the 1986 sequel to the 1984 film
The Karate Kid Part III, the 1989 sequel to the 1986 film
The Next Karate Kid, the 1994 sequel to the 1989 film
The Karate Kid (video game), based on the first two films
The Karate Kid (TV series), a 1989 animated TV series based on the first three films
The Karate Kid  (2010 film), a remake of the 1984 film
Cobra Kai, a 2018 TV series that continues the plot of the original movie

Other
Karate Kid (character), a fictional DC Comics superhero
Karate Kids U.S.A., a 1980 children's martial arts film

See also
Kung Fu Kid (disambiguation)